Events in Ukraine in 2016''':

Incumbents
President: Petro Poroshenko
Prime Minister: Arseniy Yatsenyuk (until 14 April), Volodymyr Groysman (from 14 April)

Events

 11 January 2016, The representative of the Russian Federation to the Tripartite Liaison Group, Boris Gryzlov, has brought to Kyiv Vladimir Putin's offer regarding the end of the war in Donbas, which, however, did not leave Kyiv satisfied
 President of Ukraine Petro Poroshenko stated that he has signed a contract this year, according to which he transferred his stake in Roshen Corporation to an independent "blind" trust.
Ukraine's central bank more than halved its 2016 growth forecast Thursday as the cash-strapped country battles crises ranging from falling commodity prices to a new trade embargo by Russia. The National Bank of Ukraine (NBU) also left its main borrowing rate unchanged at 22 percent in order to keep persistent inflation expectations in check.
Thanks to the “Savchenko law”, the corrupt judge Igor Zvarych was released from prison in January 2016, even though he was sentenced to 10 years in prison in 2011. Soon after the decision to release him was made, hundreds of prisoners, including murderers, rapists and robbers, appealed to the court for early release.
Influenza continues to circulate in Ukraine as well as the WHO European Region, with several regions in Ukraine exceeding the epidemic threshold. In week 5, the Ministry of Health in Ukraine reported a decrease in influenza activity but it cannot be predicted if this decrease will continue. The predominant strain continues to be influenza virus A(H1N1), the virus that emerged during the 2009 pandemic, and is known to cause illness in young adults including pregnant women.

Deaths 
 4 June – Zoya Klyuchko, entomologist, (b. 1933).
 5 August – Vira Naydyonova, industrialist (b. 1948).

References

 
2010s in Ukraine
Years of the 21st century in Ukraine
Ukraine
Ukraine